John Johnson (22 April 1732 – 17 August 1814) was an English architect and  surveyor to the county of Essex.  He is best known for designing the Shire Hall, Chelmsford.

Life
Johnson was born in Leicester.  He moved to London before his thirtieth birthday and in the late 1760s was engaged by William Berners in speculative building of Berners' estate in Marylebone.  For most of the rest of his life he lived in one of the houses that he had built in Berners Street.
In 1782 he succeeded William Hillyer as Surveyor to the County of Essex, a position that he held for thirty years, retiring at the age of 80. In 1785 he became a partner with Sir Herbert Mackworth and others in Dorsett and Co, a bank in Bond Street, but Mackworth left before 1792, the bank failed in 1797 and was wound up in 1803. After this, Johnson moved from Berners Street to Camden Town, and on his retirement in 1812 returned to Leicester, where he died.  He was buried in St Martin's Church (now Leicester Cathedral) where he is commemorated on the base of a monument by John Bacon, originally erected in 1786 as a memorial to his parents.

Works
Among Johnson's surviving works are:

Public buildings
 The Jockey Club's clubhouse, Newmarket (1771–2)
 The Shire Hall, Chelmsford (1789–91)
 The City Rooms, Leicester (1799–1800)
 Ingrams Close, Felsted School (1799–1802)
 Chelmsford Cathedral (rebuilt the nave, 1801–03)
 St Andrew's Church, Hornchurch (rebuilt the south aisle, 1802)
 County Hall, Lewes (1808–12), which became Lewes Crown Court and is now Lewes Combined Court Centre

Country houses
 Castle Ashby (rebuilt the Great Hall, 1771-4)
 Terling Place, Essex (1772-c1780)
 Woolverstone Hall, Suffolk (1776)
 Bradwell Lodge, Essex (c.1785), reconstruction of an earlier house
 Benhall Lodge, Benhall, Suffolk (1790), only a fragment of this building remains as part of 'Old Lodge', as the house was totally rebuilt in the Regency period
 Hatfield Place, Hatfield Peverel, Essex (1791–5)

London
 Asia House, no. 63 (originally no. 9), New Cavendish Street, Marylebone (c1775-77)

References

1732 births
1814 deaths
Architects from Leicester
18th-century English architects
English surveyors